Olivia Charlotte Waithe (born 31 May 1988), better known by her stage name Livvi Franc, is a British Barbadian singer-songwriter.

Early life 
Franc was born in Harrogate, North Yorkshire, England to an English mother and a Bajan father. Franc's stage name was inspired by her late maternal grandfather, Frank Wilson, she explained to Flavour Magazine that he had "noticed me playing the piano and predicted I was going to be a musician. Sadly he’s no longer here. So, in honour of him, I called myself Livvi Franc; Livvi because it’s my nickname, and Franc because it’s a funkier version of Frank." When Franc was five, the family moved to Barbados, because her parents decided that their daughters, Franc and her elder sister, should experience their Barbadian heritage. They would return to England during the summer holidays. Franc wrote her first song at age eleven and learned the guitar at fifteen and sang in school talent shows and pageants growing up.

Career
Franc's first manager discovered her when a friend of Franc's who babysitted for her gave her one of Franc's cassette tape demos. Franc then went on to record proper demos in studio in Barbados and Miami, where she met her next manager. Soon after, she was in New York meeting label heads and auditioning. She finally signed with Jive Records, after months of negotiations, after singing an Etta James song for them. Prior to signing with Jive, Franc had gone through three years of artist development and attended workshops on it. She had attended Queens College in Barbados. Jordin Sparks recorded a song written by Livvi Franc, "Walking on Snow", Franc has also written for Cheryl Cole, Kelly Clarkson, Marié Digby, Michael Jackson, Britney Spears, Rihanna and Cher Lloyd.

Franc's debut single, "Now I'm That Bitch" was released in the summer of 2009. The song topped the US Billboard Hot Dance Club Songs chart and became a top 40 hit in New Zealand and the UK. Another song, "This Is a Raid" appeared on the reboot of Melrose Place. 
Franc released her second single named "Automatik". Produced by RedOne, the single peaked at #6 on the US Hot Dance Club Songs chart. During the end of 2010, the album was eventually shelved by Jive and so Livvi left Jive Records, however quickly signed to Beluga Heights/Warner Bros., where she is currently finishing her debut album. In a UStream session, Franc said she is delaying working on her own album and instead is focusing on writing for other acts.

Artistry 
Franc has listed Nelly Furtado, Alicia Keys, Alanis Morissette as her influences and System of a Down as one of her favourite bands saying 'I listen to everything. On my iPod I have Santigold, La Roux, Nelly Furtado, some soca, and some reggae and some country music.’ Her love for such broad and diverse music is said to be reflected in her debut self-titled album. 'It’s all the different sides of me come together… There are a couple of tracks with a little reggae vibe, some with more of a UK or retro vibe. It’s different and it all falls into place.

Discography

Extended plays

Singles 

Notes
 signifies promotional single

Other appearances

Songwriting credits

Videography

Music videos

References

External links

1988 births
Living people
English women pop singers
British reggae musicians
English people of Barbadian descent
British dancehall musicians
Jive Records artists
21st-century English women singers
21st-century English singers